is a North Korea-aligned Korean international senior high school in Higashiosaka, Japan. The government of Osaka Prefecture classifies the school as a "miscellaneous school".

In July 2017, Judge Takahiro Nishida of the Osaka District Court ordered the government to include the School in its tuition waver program, determining that previous exclusions of the School were unlawful.

Notable alumni

Footballers
Park Seung-ri
Ryang Yong-gi
Ri Yong-jik
Kang Hyun-su

Boxers
Lee Ryol-li
Teiru Kinoshita

References

External links
 Osaka Korean High School 

Education in Osaka Prefecture
North Korean schools in Japan
High schools in Osaka Prefecture
Higashiōsaka